Ayano-Maysky District is an administrative and municipal district (raion), one of the seventeen in Khabarovsk Krai, Russia. It is located in the north of the krai. Its administrative center is the rural locality (a selo) of Ayan. Population:  The population of Ayan accounts for 42.2% of the district's total population.

Geography
The district has two climatic zones: a sharply continental and a maritime continental. The villages of Aim, Dzhigda, and Nelkan are located in the former, and Ayan belongs to the latter. Areas along the coast receive much precipitation and have a frequent share of cloudy days, storm winds, and blizzards.

The impact of the Sea of Okhotsk on the coastal region is constant and as it moves west inland toward the Dzhugdzhur mountain range and becomes weaker the impact creates a climatic subzone, transforming the maritime climate into a sharply continental one. The ridge of the Dzhugdzhur Mountains demarcates the border between two climates.

A unique orographic feature of the region is the circular, crater-like Kondyor Massif.  Minerals mining in the district includes one of the largest Zirconium reserves in Russia, at the Algama mine.

Demographics
Ethnic composition (2010):
 Russians – 47%
 Evenks – 45.4%
 Ukrainians – 2%
 Koreans – 1.1%
 Yakuts – 1.1%
 Others – 3.4%

History

In the 17th century, shortly after the establishment of Yakutsk, the exploration of what is now Ayano-Maysky District pursued two goals.  Yakutsk officials through eastward expansion sought to come up with new sources of tribute for the Tsar's treasury while at the same time trying to find a shorter, more convenient passage to the Sea of Okhotsk, in order to continue to care for the needs of rich Russian colonies in the Far East and North America.

In 1639, a group of Russian explorers under the leadership of Ivan Moskvitin reached the Sea of Okhotsk for the first time through the territory of modern Ayano-Maysky District.

In the first half of the 19th century, the Russian-American Company became the first trading company in the region, with its merchant office located in the port of Okhotsk. In 1842, the Company decided to find a better, more advantageous spot for a seaport.  Consequently, in 1845 the Russian-American Company's merchant office was moved to Ayan.

Ayan's prosperity, however, was not to last. After the Alaska Purchase, life was virtually brought to a standstill. By 1867, the Russian-American Company was no longer in business.  Many local businessmen and professionals joined the exodus of merchants who had discontinued their operations in the area. A recently (1850s) built and much more conveniently located Nikolayevsk-on-Amur became Russia's new main port in the Sea of Okhotsk region.

In the Russian Civil War, the territory of modern Ayano-Maysky District was the scene of the anti-Soviet Yakut Revolt. It was the last enclave of the White Forces, where General Anatoly Pepelyayev did not capitulate until June 17, 1923.

By decree of the Soviet government, Ayano-Maysky District was officially formed on December 10, 1930 by combining the areas of Ayan and Nelkan. Ayan was assigned the role of being the administrative center. In the 1930s, the Soviet government began forming state and collective farms, opened local schools and hospitals, amateur musical clubs, and otherwise encouraged the Evenks to switch from their nomadic lifestyle to a settled way of life.

In 1936, the first local farmers' market was opened with hopes of bringing locals together. State farm workers and private small farm owners sold their meat, wild game, fish, berries, mushrooms, etc.

People who made the decision to make this region their temporary home received added governmental bonuses to their pay and an earlier retirement age: for men when they reached 55 and women at 50.

With the dissolution of the Soviet Union, however, some state farms and enterprises were disbanded and government subsidies discontinued, forcing many residents to move out of the settlements to bigger cities or other regions of Russia.

References

Notes

Sources

External links
Official website of Ayano-Maysky District 
Official website of Khabarovsk Krai. Information about Ayano-Maysky District 

Districts of Khabarovsk Krai